Fred Ball (1915–2007) was an American movie executive.

Fred Ball may also refer to:

Fred Ball (footballer) (1868–1902), Australian rules footballer
Fred Uhl Ball (1945–1985), American enamellist
Fred Ball (producer), Norwegian record producer